Pathankot Airport  is a regional airport, 3 km from the nearest city Pathankot and 7 km from Pathankot Railway Station, located on the Pathankot – Majra Road. Pathankot airport serves national flights only. The airport, spread over an area of approximately 75 acres, is not well connected by public transport; only cabs are available.

Pathankot Airport was inaugurated by Mr. Praful Patel, the then Aviation Minister of India, on 21 November 2006. The facility was made possible by the efforts of Gurdaspur Member of Parliament and Bollywood actor Vinod Khanna, who had planned to make Pathankot a tourist destination and industrial hub.

Commercial flights were resumed on April 5, 2018, after a hiatus of nearly seven years. by Alliance Air, the regional subsidiary of Air India under the Regional Connectivity Scheme.

Airlines and destinations

References

Airports in Punjab, India
Transport in Pathankot
Airports established in 2006
2006 establishments in Punjab, India